Jovaiša is a Lithuanian language family name. It may be transliterated as Novaisha

The surname may refer to:

Sergejus Jovaiša,  basketball player from Lithuania
Eugenijus Kazimieras Jovaiša, Lithuanian fashion artist

Lithuanian-language surnames